Peut-être (Maybe; Perhaps) is a 1999 French science fiction comedy film. Directed by Cédric Klapisch with a budget of 75 million franc, the film runs for 109 minutes. It featured Romain Duris, Jean-Paul Belmondo, Géraldine Pailhas and Julie Depardieu. The film premiered at a Buck Rogers-themed New Year's Eve party.

Plot
After having sex with his girlfriend Lucie (Pailhas) in a bathroom, Arthur (Duris) discovers that a ceiling panel is a time portal to the Paris in the future, although it appears more like a sun-baked desert city by that point. There he meets an old man named Ako (Belmondo) who turns out to be Arthur's son. Ako attempts to persuade Arthur to impregnate Lucie so that he can exist in this future.

Cast
 Jean-Paul Belmondo as Ako
 Romain Duris as Arthur
 Géraldine Pailhas as Lucie
 Julie Depardieu as Nathalie
 Lorànt Deutsch as Prince Fur
 Emmanuelle Devos as Juliette
 Léa Drucker as Clotilde
 Vincent Elbaz as Philippe
 Hélène Fillières as Rosemonde
 Olivier Gourmet as Jean-Claude
 Riton Liebman as Mathieu
 Marceline Loridan-Ivens as Madeleine
 Olivier Py as Green Man
 Jocelyn Quivrin as The Martian
 Liliane Rovère as Marie-Jeanne
 Zinedine Soualem as Kader
 Jean-Pierre Bacri as The father
 Élisa Servier as The mother
 Cathy Guetta as The DJ
 Olivia Del Rio as The naked girl

References

External links
 

1999 films
1990s science fiction comedy films
Films directed by Cédric Klapisch
Films set in Paris
French science fiction comedy films
Films about time travel
1999 comedy films
1990s French films
Warner Bros. films